Quch Khvos (also Romanized as Qūch Khvos; also known as Dalvar-e Kūch Khows) is a village in Mahur Rural District, Mahvarmilani District, Mamasani County, Fars Province, Iran. At the 2006 census, its population was 35, in 7 families.

References 

Populated places in Mamasani County